Marcus Garvey is the third album by reggae artist Burning Spear, released in 1975 on Fox Records in Jamaica and then internationally on Island Records later in the year. The album is named after the Jamaican National Hero and Rastafari movement prophet Marcus Garvey. A dub version of it was released four months later as Garvey's Ghost.

This was the first album by Burning Spear recorded for producer Lawrence Lindo, better known by his handle taken from the assassin of Lee Harvey Oswald, Jack Ruby. Apparently, Lindo and Burning Spear realized the opening track to this album, "Marcus Garvey", on their first meeting. Island Records, whose founder Chris Blackwell had been instrumental in breaking Jamaican reggae artists Jimmy Cliff, Toots and the Maytals, and Bob Marley to an international audience, then made a deal to release it internationally, but believed the original Jamaican mix of the album to be too threatening, or at least too commercially unviable, for white audiences and therefore remixed it into what they considered a more palatable form, outraging him.  The Jamaican release also does not include the final track, "Resting Place", which had only been issued as a single there. The backing musicians, whom Lindo named the Black Disciples, had been assembled from the Soul Syndicate and the Wailers.

On July 27, 2010, this album was remastered and released by Universal's Hip-O Records reissue imprint in tandem with the dub version on one compact disc.

The album was listed in the 1999 book The Rough Guide: Reggae: 100 Essential CDs.

Track listing 
All tracks written by Winston Rodney and Phillip Fullwood except as indicated.

 "Marcus Garvey" — 3:27
 "Slavery Days" — 3:34
 "The Invasion" (W. Rodney, Carl Paisley, Fullwood) — 3:22
 "Live Good" (Marcus Rodney, Mackba Rodney, Winston Rodney) — 3:14
 "Give Me" (W. Rodney) — 3:11
 "Old Marcus Garvey" — 4:03
 "Tradition" (D. Hines, R. Willington, W. Rodney) — 3:30
 "Jordan River" (W. Rodney, M. Lawrence, Fullwood) — 3:00
 "Red, Gold & Green" (A. Folkes, W. Rodney, Fullwood) — 3:14
 "Resting Place" (W. Rodney) — 3:10 (not on original Jamaican LP release)

Reception

Ed Ward in a 1976 review in Rolling Stone felt that the music was rootsy and compelling, but that it wouldn't be understood by American audiences, and that the lead song about Marcus Garvey wouldn't make sense to anyone who didn't know Jamaican culture.

Robert Christgau felt that it was the most African-sounding and most political reggae album to be released in America at the time.

Legacy
Jo-Ann Greene in an Allmusic retrospective summary feels that the album was a significant recording in roots reggae, though regrets that Island subsidiary Mango remixed the album too commercially, diluting some of the "haunting atmospheres" of producer Jack Ruby's original mix.

The album was included in Robert Dimery's 1001 Albums You Must Hear Before You Die where Jim Harrington commented that he felt it had "a poignant blend of religious aspirations and cultural concerns".

Musicians 
 Burning Spear – lead vocals

The Black Disciples 
 Delroy Hines – harmony vocals
 Rupert Willington – harmony vocals
 Bobby Ellis – trumpet
 Vincent "Trommie" Gordon – trombone, clavinet
 Carlton "Sam" Samuels – flute
 Herman Marquis – alto saxophone
 Richard "Dirty Harry" Hall – tenor saxophone
 Tyrone "Organ D" Downie – piano, organ
 Bernard "Touter" Harvey – piano, organ, clavinet
 Earl "Chinna" Smith – lead guitar
 Valentine "Tony" Chin – rhythm guitar
 Robbie "Rabbi" Shakespeare – bass
 Aston "Family Man" Barrett – bass
 Leroy "Horsemouth" Wallace – drums

Production credits 
 Engineers:  George Philpott and Errol Thompson
 Recorded at Randy's Recording Studio, North Parade, Kingston, Jamaica
 Mixed at Joe Gibbs Studio, Retirement Crescent, Kingston, Jamaica
 Special thanks to Lloyd Coxone

References

External links

Marcus Garvey (Adobe Flash) at Radio3Net (streamed copy where licensed) 
Marcus Garvey / Garvey's Ghost (Adobe Flash) at Myspace (streamed copy where licensed)

Burning Spear albums
1975 albums
Island Records albums